Hypograph may refer to:

 Hypograph (mathematics), the set of points lying below the graph of a function
 Hypograph, or hypogram, something written at the end of a document (for example, a postscript)

See also 
 Hypergraph, in mathematics
 Hypographa, a genus of moths
 Hypographia, another, obsolete, genus of moths
 Hippogriff, a legendary creature